Ľudovít Kroner (19 December 1925 – 19 December 2000) was a Slovak actor and one of the first generation members of the Kroner family. He was a younger brother of Jozef and older of Ján Kroner.

See also
 List of Czechoslovak films
 List of people surnamed Kroner

Further reading

References

 General
 
 
Specific

External links

 Ľudovít Kroner at FDb.cz
 
 Ľudovít Kroner at Kinobox.cz
 

Ludovit
1925 births
Slovak male film actors
Slovak male television actors
Slovak male stage actors
20th-century Slovak male actors
2000 deaths